Admetula superstes is a species of sea snail, a marine gastropod mollusk in the family Cancellariidae, the nutmeg snails.

Description

Distribution
This species is found along New Zealand.

References

 Bouchet P. & Petit R.E. (2008). New species and new records of southwest Pacific Cancellariidae. The Nautilus 122(1): 1–18.

External links

Cancellariidae
Gastropods described in 1930